Viscera is the third extended play from My Epic. Facedown Records released the EP on May 6, 2016.

Critical reception

Christopher Smith writes, "Viscera doesn't have quite the same lyrical mastery as Broken Voice, nor the musical epicness of Behold, but it is nonetheless a captivating and thought-provoking mini-album." Dylan O'Connor says, "if you have the patience to sit through longer songs with a slow burn, Viscera is a rewarding listen." David Craft states, "don't let this gem pass you by." Fryberger opines, "Viscera is an EP that feels like a full-length record, as its five songs are full of not only minutes and seconds, but more depth than a lot of full-length records these days."

Mary Nikkel describes, "Full of hard-edged guitar tones, otherworldly vocals and lyrics that are both vividly poetic and intensely human, Viscera is the best yet from My Epic." Nicholas Senior believes, "Viscera is a great example of a good band evolving into a great one...Viscera sees the band merging their pasts quite well, with Yets post-Thrice-style grunge building upon the graceful beauty of Behold." Chad Brown suggests, "those who remain, sink in, so-to-speak, and allow themselves to be swept up by the tangible emotions, sweeping melodies, and poetic lyricism will be rewarded by one of 2016’s most satisfying and frankly beautiful releases."

Track listing

Chart performance

References

2016 EPs
My Epic albums
Facedown Records albums